The Secret Nights of Lucrezia Borgia (Italian:Le notti segrete di Lucrezia Borgia, Spanish:Las noches secretas de Lucrecia Borgia) is a 1982 Italian-Spanish historical film directed by Roberto Bianchi Montero and starring Sirpa Lane, George Hilton and Willey Reynolds.

Cast
 Sirpa Lane as Lucrezia Borgia
 George Hilton as Duccio  
 Willey Reynolds as Cesare
 Marino Masé as The Duke 
 María Salerno as Eugenia 
 Tito García as Grinta  
 Françoise Perrot as Celine  
 Mario Novelli
 Bruno Di Luia 
 Erigo Palombini 
 Franco Daddi 
 Rafael Fernández 
 José Riesgo 
 Patricia Bernart 
 Mara Mateo 
 Carmen Carrión

References

Bibliography

External links 
 

1982 films
1982 multilingual films
1980s historical comedy films
Italian historical comedy films
Spanish historical comedy films
Italian multilingual films
Spanish multilingual films
1980s Italian-language films
1980s Spanish-language films
Films directed by Roberto Bianchi Montero
Films set in the 16th century
Cultural depictions of Lucrezia Borgia
1980s Italian films
1980s Spanish films